The Champaign-Urbana Bandits were a baseball team that played in the Great Central League in 1994. The team played at Illinois Field, which is home of the University of Illinois baseball team.
 
Casey Fisk, son of Carlton Fisk, was a utility player on the club as well as interim field manager.

See also
 Independent baseball

References

Defunct minor league baseball teams
Defunct baseball teams in Illinois
Sports teams in Champaign–Urbana, Illinois
1994 establishments in Illinois
1994 disestablishments in Illinois
Baseball teams established in 1994
Baseball teams disestablished in 1994